Daydream Forever is the third studio album by American indietronica musician Kamtin Mohager's project The Chain Gang of 1974. Released on February 4, 2014, by Warner Bros. Records, it is the major label debut of The Chain Gang of 1974, whose previous records were released under indie label Modern Art Records. The album is a follow-up to the project's 2013 single "Miko", which features as the fifth track on the album, and successful promotional single "Sleepwalking", which also features on the album, as the third track.

Background
Born in San Jose, California and raised in Hawaii before moving to Denver, Kamtin Mohager joined 3OH!3 as a touring bassist from 2007 through 2010. He subsequently self-released Fantastic Nostalgic: The Early Recordings in 2010. That year also saw the release of his full-length debut, White Guts. Mohager moved to Los Angeles to record the follow-up album, Wayward Fire, which was released on Modern Art Records in 2011.

Recording
Daydream Forever was recorded with producer Isom Innis, of Foster the People fame. The album was recorded over the course of seventeen weeks from October 8, 2012 to February 4, 2013 in Malibu, California. Six of the working titles for songs placed for recording during the creative process for Daydream Forever were "This Godless Girl", "Lola Suzanne", "Witch", 
"Strfck" , "Sleepwalking", and "Melbourne".

Critical reception

At Alternative Press, Dan LeRoy rated the album three-and-a-half out of five stars, stating that this album is not intended "for revivalists only." Fred Thomas of AllMusic called it "a must for anyone in an especially strong phase of '80s nostalgia."

Track listing

Personnel
The Chain Gang of 1974
Kamtin Mohager – vocals, music, production

Additional personnel
Isom Innis – production

Charts

Release history

References

External links
 

2014 albums
Warner Records albums
The Chain Gang of 1974 albums